C. pearsei may refer to:

 Chaceus pearsei, a crab in the family Pseudothelphusidae
 Cincelichthys pearsei, a fish in the family Cichlidae
 Crocosmia pearsei, a plant in the family Iridaceae